Against All Odds: Lost and Found is a television series which aired on 8 November 1994. It was produced by the British Broadcasting Corporation. The movie was directed by Kim Flitcroft, written by Kate Wood, and it starred Hannah Taylor-Gordon.

References

External links
 

BBC Television shows
British television films
1994 television films
1994 films